Bransby Blake Cooper FRS, (2 September 1792, Great Yarmouth-18 August 1853, London) was an English Surgeon.

Bransby was the son Dr Samuel Cooper, a Church of England clergyman and grandson of Maria Susanna Bransby, the author of several novels. At an early age he resolved to join the Royal Navy, signing on as a midshipman on HMS Stately in 1805. However, he suffered from sea-sickness to such an extent he had to abandon any nautical career.

He was influenced by his uncle, Astley Cooper to enter medicine.

References

1792 births
English surgeons
1853 deaths